Melville Jacobs (July 3, 1902 – July 31, 1971) was an American anthropologist known for his extensive fieldwork on cultures of the Pacific Northwest. He was born in New York City. After studying with Franz Boas he became a member of the faculty of the University of Washington in 1928 and remained until his death in 1971. Especially during the earlier part of his career, from 1928 until 1936, he collected large amounts of linguistic data and text from a wide range of languages including Sahaptin, Molale, Kalapuya, Clackamas, Tillamook, Alsea, Upper Umpqua, Galice and Chinook Jargon.

He left funds to establish the Jacobs Research Fund, which supports anthropological research in the Pacific Northwest.  His papers, including extensive raw linguistic material that has provided the basis for subsequent research on now extinct languages, are held by the University of Washington in the Jacobs Archive.

In 2019, the "Melville Jacobs Collection of Native Americans of the American Northwest (1929-1939)" was selected by the Library of Congress for preservation in the National Recording Registry as "culturally, historically, or aesthetically significant".

He was married to Elizabeth Jacobs (anthropologist), also an anthropologist.

Works
A Sketch of Northern Sahaptin Grammar (1931)
Notes on the Structure of Chinook Jargon (1932)
Northwest Sahaptin Texts, I (1934)
Texts in Chinook Jargon (1936)
Northwest Sahaptin Texts, II (1937)
Coos Narrative and Ethnologic Texts (1939)
Coos Myth Texts (1940)
Historic Perspectives in Indian Languages of Oregon and Washington (1941)
Kalapuya Texts (1945)
Outline of Anthropology (1947)
General Anthropology; A Brief Survey of Physical, Cultural, and Social Anthropology (1952)
Clackamas Chinook Texts (1959)
The People are Coming Soon; Analyses of Clackamas Chinook Myths and Tales (1960)
Pattern in Cultural Anthropology (1964)
The Anthropologist Looks at Myth (1966)

References

Winters, Christopher. International Dictionary of Anthropologists. New York: Garland, 1991
Seaburg, William. "Badger and Coyote Were Neighbors: Melville Jacobs on Northwest Indian Myths and Tales", Oregon State University Press

External links
Minnesota State University biographical sketch
Jacobs Research Fund

Archives
 Melville Jacobs Papers. 1918–1978. 78.23 cubic feet.
 Richard A. Pelto Papers. 1969. .21 cubic foot (3 reel-to-reel tapes, 7"; 7 cassettes.) Contains interviews conducted by Pelto with Melville Jacobs

1902 births
1971 deaths
University of Washington faculty
Linguists of Na-Dene languages
Linguists of Eskaleut languages
Linguists of Sahaptian languages
Linguists of Chinookan languages
Linguists of Chinook Jargon
20th-century American anthropologists
Presidents of the American Folklore Society